The 2010–11 Topklasse season was the first and inaugural edition of the newly created Dutch third tier. A total 32 teams competed in the league, one of them coming from the fully professional 2009–10 Eerste Divisie, and the remaining 31 from the amateur 2009–10 Hoofdklasse. The competition was split into two leagues, a "Saturday" and a "Sunday" one, who differ by the day the related games are usually played.

The league was originally expected to feature two relegations from Eerste Divisie; this was however made impossible by the exclusion of bankrupt-collapsed HFC Haarlem from professional football in January 2010. HFC Haarlem's place will be taken by another Hoofdklasse team which will be decided by play-offs between the losers of the initial play-off games in the Hoofdklasse. The only relegated team from Eerste Divisie, last-placed FC Oss, could however keep their place in the second tier, following the financial collapse of BV Veendam in May 2010; such event did not occur in the end, after it was confirmed that Veendam had won their appeal against bankruptcy in court later on June.

The league was originally announced to receive national weekly media coverage on Dutch TV channel RTL 7, with a one-hour synthesis of the games on Saturdays and Sundays.

After 11 matches, Dijkse Boys voluntarily withdrew from the Sunday Topklasse due to financial troubles. The club will be relegated from the Topklasse.

Three clubs expressed interest in promotion, FC Oss from the Sunday league, and Rijnsburgse Boys and SV Spakenburg of the Saturday league. Ultimately, IJsselmeervogels were crowned Saturday league champions, whereas FC Oss won the Sunday league title; this meant that FC Oss were already promoted at the end of the regular season, since IJsselmeervogels opted not to apply for promotion to the Eerste Divisie instead.

Teams

Saturday league

Sunday league

Composition of inaugural season
For the inaugural season of the Topklasse, 32 teams were picked, 31 of which coming from the Hoofdklasse, and one - FC Oss - being relegated from 2009–10 Eerste Divisie. Of the 31 teams from the Hoofdklasse, 24 were promoted automatically (the top four placed in the six round of the 2009–10 Hoofdklasse, whereas the remaining seven vacancies were filled through a playoff tournament.

Playoff promotions
A post-season playoff tournament was held between May and June 2010 in order to fill seven more vacancies for the season. Such tournament was divided into two phases: the first phase featured six two-legged games, whose winners would have been promoted into the Topklasse.

The six defeated teams from the first phase (three from Saturday Hoofdklasse, three from Sunday Hoofdklasse) then took part to a second phase, in which two rounds composed by three clubs each were organized: the two round winners will successively play against each other in a neutral field, one-legged final that will assign the remaining spot in the league.

From Saturday Hoofdklasse, first phase
HHC Hardenberg (Hardenberg)
SC Genemuiden (Genemuiden, Zwartewaterland)
VV Katwijk (Katwijk)

From Sunday Hoofdklasse, first phase
Dijkse Boys (Helmond)
HVV Hollandia (Hoorn)
VVSB (Noordwijkerhout)

From second phase
 ARC (Alphen aan den Rijn)

League tables

Saturday league

Sunday league

Championship play-offs

IJsselmeervogels has won the overall Topklasse title, but didn't apply for promotion to the Eerste Divisie. FC Oss was therefore promoted instead.

Promotion/relegation play-offs

Montfoort and WKE promoted to 2011–12 Topklasse. CSV Apeldoorn relegated to 2011–12 Hoofdklasse. FC Hilversum were originally relegated, but later readmitted due to RBC Roosendaal's disbandment and consequent readmission of Almere City FC into the Eerste Divisie.

References

Derde Divisie seasons
Neth
3